Afrofuture (stylized as AfroFuture), formerly known as Afrochella is an African music festival that started in 2019.

Background 
AfroFuture is one of several cultural events that takes place in Ghana in December, including the Afro Nation festival and BHIM. The Black Star Line Festival is scheduled to launch in January 2023.

History 

AfroFuture was co-founded in 2019 as Afrochella by Abdul Abdullah. The festival is organised by Culture Management Group.Afrochella 2020 occurred from December 26 to January 1 in El Wak Stadium and featured Tiwa Savage, Joey-B and Juls, Sarkodie, Samini, Wande Coal, Distruction Boyz, Mercedes Benson, Neya Music, and Amarachi Nwosu. Afrochella 2021 featured Wizkid and Stonebwoy.

In October 2022, the organisers were sued by the organisers of Coachella festival for trademark infringement.

The last Afrochella took place in Accra's El-Wak stadium on December 28 and 29 2022. The 2022 festival theme was Afrofuturism. Performers included Stonebwoy, Asake, Ayra Starr, Juls, Meek Mill, Rema,  Black Sherif,  Camidoh, Aerostar, and Gyakie with Burna Boy performing the headline act. Ayra Starr fell while performing and called upon the organisers to clean the stage between performances.

References

External links 

 Official website

Music festivals in Ghana
2019 establishments in Ghana
Annual events in Ghana
Cultural festivals in Ghana